The Association of Vineyard Churches, also known as the Vineyard Movement, is a neocharismatic evangelical Christian denomination.

The Vineyard Movement is rooted in the charismatic renewal and historic evangelicalism. Instead of the mainstream charismatic label, however, the movement has preferred the term Empowered Evangelicals (a term coined by Rich Nathan and Ken Wilson in their book of the same name) to reflect their roots in traditional evangelicalism as opposed to classical Pentecostalism. Members also sometimes describe themselves as the "radical middle" between evangelicals and Pentecostals, which is a reference to the book The Quest for the Radical Middle, a historical survey of the Vineyard by Bill Jackson. Membership requires that individuals serve in their church.

It has been associated with the "Signs and Wonders" movement, the Toronto blessing, the Kansas City Prophets and a particular style of Christian worship music.

The Vineyard operates a publishing house, Vineyard International Publishing.

History
The Vineyard has its origins in the founding of a Calvary Chapel church by Kenn Gulliksen and his wife Joanie, members of Calvary Chapel Costa Mesa, in 1974, in Los Angeles in the United States. In early 1975, thirteen groups met at the Beverly Hills Women's club. These Bible studies, and others like them, were attended by many popular actors/actresses and musicians including Bob Dylan. Gulliksen's Vineyard had spun off sister churches.

In 1977, John Wimber, an evangelical pastor and teacher on church growth, founded a Calvary Chapel in Yorba Linda, California. Wimber's teaching on healing and the ministry of the Holy Spirit led to conflict. In a meeting with Calvary Chapel leaders, it was suggested that Wimber's church stop using the Calvary name and affiliate with Gulliksen's Vineyard movement. In 1982, Wimber's church changed its name to the Anaheim Vineyard Christian Fellowship. Gulliksen turned over the churches under his oversight to Wimber, beginning his leadership of the Vineyard movement. Evangelist Lonnie Frisbee credits Gulliksen as founder of the Vineyard movement. In 1982, 8 churches founded the Association of Vineyard Churches. 

Beginning in 1988, Wimber established relationships with such self-proclaimed prophets as Paul Cain, Bob Jones, and Mike Bickle who pastored Kansas City Fellowship, an independent church which would come under the Vineyard banner as Metro Vineyard (see Kansas City Prophets). For a time, these men had considerable influence on Wimber and the Vineyard—according to Jackson, Wimber's son was delivered from drug addiction through a prophetic word from Jones. However, there were those in the Vineyard who were skeptical, and Wimber himself became disillusioned over the restorationist teaching and failed prophecies of these men. Around 1991, Wimber began to distance himself from the prophetic movement, leading the Vineyard back to a church-planting direction, while Bickle's church withdrew and dropped the Vineyard label.

The Vineyard Movement suffered a visible leadership vacuum after Wimber's death on November 16, 1997. However, Todd Hunter, who served as National Coordinator since February 1994 and as acting Director of the Vineyard at the time of Wimber's death, became the National Director in January 1998 and served in that capacity until he resigned in May 2000. After Hunter's resignation, the National Board of Directors named Bert Waggoner of Sugar Land, Texas, as the new National Director. As of 2007, the Association of Vineyard Churches includes over 2400 churches around the world, and this number continues to grow due to a strong priority placed on church-planting within the Vineyard mission.  In October, 2011, Phil Strout was selected by the National Board of Directors to succeed Waggoner as National Director in January 2013.  He served until October, 2021 when Jay Pathak was installed as the National Director.

Statistics
The Association's website claims that in 2022 it had 2,400 churches in 95 countries.

Beliefs and practices

Doctrinal statements
For most of the early life of the Vineyard Movement, Vineyard churches had no official statement of faith.  This is not to be interpreted as an absence of a common belief structure; rather, the primary reasons for the absence of such a declaration were:

 the demonstrative teaching of John Wimber, who effectively set the tone and doctrinal beliefs of the movement
 a desire to reflect the "low-key," "low-pressure" environment of the church that encouraged people to "come as you are"
 specifically, de-emphasizing any atmosphere or actions that could be considered overtly dogmatic.

According to text in the official Vineyard Statement of Faith released in 1994, an effort to create a common Statement of Faith had been underway since 1983, but took 10+ years to complete because: "On one hand, we felt obliged to set forth our biblical and historically orthodox beliefs, on the other hand, we wanted to describe the values and priorities that make the Vineyard unique within the context of Evangelicalism."

LGBTQ+ position
In a 2020 letter to local church leaders, Vineyard Canada expressed its position that having a non-heterosexual orientation is not itself sinful, however the church does not allow the officiating of same sex marriages or licensing people in same sex marriages for pastoral ministry. This letter also distinguished gender identity from sexual orientation as its own theology and policy matter that requires further consideration.

Branches

United States
The national headquarters of Vineyard USA is currently located in Stafford, Texas. Vineyard USA is divided into eight regions, and each region has clusters of churches grouped together by location, facilitated by an Area Pastoral Care Leader (APCL). The APCL's work together with the Regional Overseer (RO) to provide leadership and encouragement to the region. The central governing body of the Vineyard in the U.S. is known as the Executive Team, and includes the National Director. Currently, the President and National Director is Jay Pathak. All major strategic decisions, including theological and doctrinal statements, are made by the National Board. In 2018, Vineyard USA is estimated to have approximately 200,000 members in 600 churches.

United Kingdom and Ireland

Denmark
As of December 2022, there are seven Vineyard churches in Denmark. Those are located in Aarhus, Odense, Roskilde, Aalborg, Rønne (Bornholm), and Helsingør.

Vineyard Worship
 

Vineyard Worship is a record label created and used by the Association of Vineyard Churches. The organization uses it to release worship albums. A UK branch of the record label exists, called Vineyard Records. Its musicians include Kathryn Scott, Nigel Briggs, Samuel Lane, Nigel Hemming, Brenton Brown, Brian Doerksen, Andy Park, Jeremy Riddle, Kevin Prosch, Marc James and Sara Brusco.

History
Vineyard Music was developed by the Vineyard church in 1985. The church began to write its own worship songs, so John Wimber founded Mercy Records. This later became Vineyard Worship.

Early discography
 Worship Songs Of The Vineyard 1: Hosanna (1985)
 Worship Songs Of The Vineyard 2: You Are Here (1985)
 Worship Songs Of The Vineyard 3: Come Holy Spirit
 Worship Songs Of The Vineyard 4: Glory (1986)
 Worship Songs Of The Vineyard 5: Draw Me Closer (1988)
 Worship Songs Of The Vineyard 6: We Welcome You (1989)
 Worship Songs Of The Vineyard 7: No One but You (1989)
 Worship Songs Of The Vineyard 8: Give Him Praise (1990)
 Worship Songs Of The Vineyard 9: I Want to Know You (1990)
 Worship Songs Of The Vineyard 10: Refiner's Fire (1991)
 Worship Songs Of The Vineyard 11: Bring Your Kingdom (1992)
 Worship Songs Of The Vineyard 12: Lord Over All (1993)
 Hungry (1999)

Controversies
In 1994, a Vineyard church in Toronto, Canada, was criticized by Christian leaders for promoting physical manifestations of the Holy Spirit, such as laughter, weeping, and shaking.  Critics, such as Hank Hanegraaff in his book,  Counterfeit Revival, charged the Toronto Blessing (under Wimber's authority at the time) with promoting heresy for three main reasons: first, claiming unusual experiences of the Holy Spirit including physical responses, speaking in tongues, and prophesying; second, claiming that these experiences of spiritual revelation were equal in importance to the Bible; and third, claiming that these experiences were a sign that God was doing "something new."  Hanegraaff held that the Toronto Blessing (and thus the Vineyard movement) was denying sola scriptura or the “sufficiency of Scripture”, a doctrinal tenet to which the majority of Protestant churches adhere, by suggesting that all believers should come to see what "new thing" God was doing in Toronto.  To cessationist and conservative thinking, this "new thing" felt dangerous and potentially cultist, putting the inerrant word of God on equal footing with the expression of a spiritual gift or, in the Hanegraaff's position, undermining the Bible with false teachings.  In 1995, the Toronto church was evicted from Vineyard for losing focus on the Bible.

See also 

 Bible
 Born again
 Worship service (evangelicalism)
 Jesus Christ
 Believers' Church

Notes and references

Further reading
Worshiping with the Anaheim Vineyard: The Emergence of Contemporary Worship by Andy Park, Lester Ruth, and Cindy Rethmeier 
The Quest for the Radical Middle: A History of the Vineyard by Bill Jackson  – A look at the history of the Vineyard through 1999.
The Way It Was by Carol Wimber  – A biography of John & Carol Wimber's life before and during their time in the Vineyard.
Power Healing by John Wimber  – John Wimber's teachings regarding healing
Power Evangelism by John Wimber  – John Wimber's teachings regarding evangelism
Empowered Evangelicals by Rich Nathan and Ken Wilson 
Who Is My Enemy by Rich Nathan 
Jesus Brand Spirituality by Ken Wilson 
Saving God's Green Earth: Rediscovering the Church's Responsibility to Environmental Stewardship by Tri Robinson 
Small Footprint, Big Handprint: How to Live Simply and Love Extravagantly by Tri Robinson 
Naturally Supernatural by Gary Best 
 Conspiracy of Kindness by Steve Sjogren  – Detailing the practice of "Servant Evangelism" embraced and employed by many of the churches within the Vineyard Movement in early 1990s to present as well as a large portion of evangelical churches outside the movement.
Not The Religious Type by Dave Schmelzer  – A perspective on faith in Jesus from a former atheist-turned-Vineyard pastor.
Breakthrough by Dr. Derek Morphew, Academic Dean of Vineyard Institute. A perspective of the Gospel as a proclamation of the Kingdom of God.

External links
Vineyard International Consortium

 
Charismatic denominations
Evangelical denominations in North America
Christian new religious movements
Members of the National Association of Evangelicals